Tamayorkis is a genus of flowering plants belonging to the family Orchidaceae.

Its native range is from Arizona and New Mexico to Texas, USA and also Mexico and Guatemala in South America. 

The genus name of Tamayorkis is in honour of Roberto González Tamayo (1940–2014), Mexican engineer and botanist, professor at the University of Guadalajara. 
It was first described and published in Fragm. Florist. Geobot., Suppl. Vol.3 on page 121 in 1995.

Known species
According to Kew:
Tamayorkis ehrenbergii 
Tamayorkis hintonii 
Tamayorkis porphyrea 
Tamayorkis wendtii

References

Orchids
Orchid genera
Plants described in 1995
Flora of Arizona 
Flora of the South-Central United States 
Flora of Mexico
Flora of Guatemala